Kwang Soo Kim is a South Korean professor in chemistry, an adjunct professor in physics, and the director of Center for Superfunctional Materials (CSM), of Ulsan National Institute of Science and Technology (UNIST) in South Korea. He received his B.S. and M.S. degrees in Applied Chemistry from Seoul National University (1971, 1973) and also an M.S. degree in Physics from Korea Advanced Institute of Science and Technology (KAIST) (1975). He obtained his Ph.D. degree from University of California, Berkeley (1982). His research fields include Theoretical/Computational Chemistry/Physics and Experimental Nanosciences.

Kim was named a National Honor Scientist by South Korea's Ministry of Education, Science and Technology in 2010.

Professional experience
He spent a few years as an IBM Postdoctoral Fellow and Research Assistant Professor at Rutgers University. He worked as a Professor in POSTECH from 1988 to 2014, and he is currently a Distinguished Professor at Ulsan National Institute of Science and Technology (UNIST).

Research
Kim and his research group are interested in both Theoretical/Computational Chemistry/Physics and Experimental Nanosciences. Specifically, the fields of research that they delve into include investigation of ab initio theory, Molecular dynamics simulation, Nonequilibrium thermodynamics and entanglement perturbation to provide understanding of intermolecular interactions, clusters, molecular recognition, drug design and nanomaterials.
Furthermore, his team is developing functional molecules/materials for molecular sensing and engineering, nanodevices, green chemistry, DNA sequencing and energy storage.

Positions
 Director Center for Superfunctional Materials (CSM), UNIST (2014–present) 
 Distinguished Professor of Dept. of Chemistry, UNIST (2014–present)
 Director of CSM, Pohang University of science and Technology POSTECH (1997-2014)
 Professor of Dept. of Chemistry at Pohang University of Science & Technology POSTECH (1988-2014)
 Visiting Scholar, Dept. Elect. Engineering & Nano Center, Columbia University (2004-2005)
 Visiting Scientist/Professor, Dept. of physics, MIT (1994-1995)
 Visiting Assistant Professor, Researcher Assistant Professor, Rutgers University (1985-1987)
 Postdoctoral Researcher Fellow, IBM (1982-1985)
 Instructor, Assistant professor, Dept. of Physics Chungnam National University. (1975-1978)

Awards and honors
 Mulliken Lecture, University of Georgia, USA (2011)
 Ranked within the top 500 chemists (only one among Korean nationals): H-index ranking of well known living chemists: Update online by Chemistry World, UK, on Dec 12,2011
 Korea National Honor Scientist (2010)
 Korea Premium Science and Technology Award (2010)
 Fukui medal from Asia-Pacific Association of Theoretical and Computational Chemistry (APATCC) (2010)
 International Academy of Quantum Molecular Science (IAQMS): membership elected (2009)
 POSTECH Fellow (2009-2014)
 Korea Science Award from Korean President (2004)
 Academic Achievement Award from the Korean Chemical Society (2001)

Publications
Kim published over 400 papers in prestigious journals such as Nature, Science, Nature Nanotechnology, Nature Communications, Chemical Reviews, Chemical Reviews Society, Proc. Natl. Acad. Sci, Accounts of Chemical Research, Physical Review Letters, Journal of the American Chemical Society, Angewandte Chemie International Edition, Chemistry - A European Journal, Organic Letters, The Journal of Organic Chemistry, Physical Review, The Journal of Chemical Physics, The Journal of Physical Chemistry, etc.

Books and chapters

 Theory and Applications of Computational Chemistry-The First 40 Years,(Elsevier) 2005 (PP. 1–1308), C.E.Dykstra, G.Frenking, Kwang S. Kim and G.E. Scuseria (Editors)

Selected publications

J. Y. Lee, et al.

 
 
W. Y. Kim and K. S. Kim

 
 
K. S. Kim, Y. Zhao, H. Jang, S. Y. Lee, J. M. Kim, K. S. Kim, J.-H. Ahn, P. Kim, J.-Y. Choi and B. H. Hong

 
 
Y. Chun, N. J. Singh, I.-C. Hwang, J. W. Lee, S. U. Yu, and K. S. Kim

 
J. N. Tiwari, K. Nath, S. Kumar, R. N. Tiwari, K.C. Kemp, N. H. Le, D. H. Youn, J. S. Lee, K. S. Kim

 
K. S. Kim, P. Tarakeshwar, J. Y. Lee

 
V. Georgakilas, M. Otyepka, A. B. Bourlinos, V. Chandra, N. Kim, K. C. Kemp, P. Hobza, R. Zboril, and K. S. Kim

 
J. Yoon, S. K. Kim, N. J. Singh and K. S. Kim

 
 
A. C. Rajan, M. R. Rezapour, J. Yun, Y. Cho, W. J. Cho, S. K. Min, G. Lee, and K. S. Kim

 

 
B. H. Hong, J. Y. Lee, C.-W. Lee, J. C. Kim, S. C. Bae, and K. S. Kim

Editor and board memberships of international journals
 Journal of Physics Chemistry A, B, C (Am. Chem. Soc.)-(2015–present)-Senior Editor
 Wiley Interdisciplinary Reviews: Computational Molecular Science (Wiley)-(2011–present)
 Chemistry Letters (Chem. Soc. Japan)-(2010–present)
 NPG Asia Materials (Nature Publishing Group)-(2009–present) 
 Chemical Physics Letter (Elsevier)-(2009–present)
 Advances in Physical Chemistry (Hindawi)-(2008–present)
 Computational and Theoretical Chemistry (Elsevier)-(2007–present)
 Chemistry-An Asian Journal (Wiley-VCH)-(2006-2013)
 Journal of Computational Chemistry (Wiley- VCH)-(2005–present)
 Bulletin of Korean Chemical Society (2000-2009) (Associate Editor)

Patents
B. H. Hong, J. Y. Lee, and K.S. Kim,  Synthesis and applications of nanoscale lens through self-assembly process, Patent No: 10-1166415, Registration Date : 2012.07.11, Application No:10-2009-0084121 (2009.9.7), Country Registered: Korea
S. K. Min, W. Y. Kim, Y. Cho, K. S. Kim, Device and method for ultrafast DNA sequencing based on graphene nanoribbons, Patent No: 10-12972226, Registration Date : 2013.8.9, Application No: 10-2011-0056530 (2011.06.10), Country Registered: Korea [그래핀 나노리본을 이용한 초고속 염기서열 분석 소자 및 방법]
B. H. Hong, J. Y. Lee, P. Kim, and K.S. Kim, Growth and applications of ultralong carbon nanotubes, Patent No : US 8,080,281 B2, Registration Date : 2011.12.20, Application No:12/412,984, Country Registered: USA [USA Patent No, : PCT/US2007/020778 (60/848,023); (2007.9.27)]
V. Chandra, Y. Chun, J. W. Lee, I.-C. Hwang, K. S. Kim, Hybrid materials comprising graphene and iron oxide, Method for manufacturing the same and Apparatus for treating waste water using the same, Application No:13/279,291, Filing Date :2011.10.23, Country Registered: USA. "Hybrid materials comprising graphene and iron oxide, Method for manufacturing thereof and Appratus for treating waste water using thereof ", Application No: 10-2010-0038705, Filing Date : 2010.04.26, Country Registered: Korea
W. Y. Kim and K. S. Kim, Spin-valve devices based on graphene nanoribbons, [그래핀 나노리본을 이용한 스핀밸브 소자], Patent No: 10-0980680, Registration Date : 2010.09.01, Application No:10-2008-0077414, Country Registered: Korea
B. H. Hong, C.-W. Lee, and K.S. Kim, Synthesis of organic nanotubes having suitable electrochemical and photochemical properties and synthesis of ultrathin nanowires using same as templates, European Patent No. (EP 1264919; 02 002 096.2, December 2002), Korean Patent No. (0439579, 2004), USA patent No. (6762331, 2004).
S. J. Lee and K. S. Kim, Copyrighted S/W: POSMOL (Pohang Sci-tech MoLecular modeling package), Application No:2000-01-12-4239, Filing Date : 2000.06, Country Registered: Korea

References

1950 births
Living people
South Korean chemists
Seoul National University alumni
University of California, Berkeley alumni
Computational chemists